Hal Brands (born 1983) is an American international relations scholar of U.S. foreign policy. He is the Henry A. Kissinger Distinguished Professor of Global Affairs at the Johns Hopkins University School of Advanced International Studies (SAIS) and a resident scholar at the American Enterprise Institute. He graduated from Stanford University with a BA in history and political science and earned his MA, MPhil, and PhD in history from Yale University. His father is the historian H. W. Brands.

Bibliography

Books

 
 Latin America's Cold War (2010) 
 What Good is Grand Strategy? Power and Purpose in American Statecraft from Harry S. Truman to George W. Bush (2014)
 (editor, with Jeremi Suri) The Power of the Past: History and Statecraft (2015)
 Making the Unipolar Moment: U.S. Foreign Policy and the Rise of the Post-Cold War Order (2016)
 American Grand Strategy in the Age of Trump (2018)
 (With Charles Edel) The Lessons of Tragedy (2019)
 The Twilight Struggle: What the Cold War Teaches Us about Great-Power Rivalry Today (2022)

Critical studies and reviews of Brands' work
American grand strategy in the age of Trump

References

External links

American Enterprise Institute Profile
School of Advanced International Studies profile
Foreign Policy Research Institute profile 
The case for Bush revisionism: Reevaluating the legacy of America’s 43rd President by Hal Brands & Peter Feaver

1983 births
Living people
21st-century American male writers
American foreign policy writers
American male non-fiction writers
International relations scholars
Johns Hopkins University faculty
Neoconservatism
Stanford University alumni
Yale College alumni